On Indian Railways, The Double Decker Express is a series of express trains composed of bi-level seating arrangements for railway passengers, operated by the Indian Railways. These trains were started for shorter routes in order to serve more people than a traditional chair car carriage. This type of train permitted the passengers to catch the train at the last minute of the journey with a confirmed reservation. These days, the stainless steel LHB Coaches built at Kapurthala Coach Factory are utilized in AC Double Decker Trains.. This type of trains was introduced on short travel routes and to cater more people than a conventional chair car carriage. This also allowed the passengers to plan last-minute journeys with confirmed reservations. Latest stainless steel LHB coaches, manufactured at Kapurthala Coach Factory are being used for AC Double Decker trains. The Howrah–Dhanbad AC Double Decker Express was the first of its type to be introduced.

Currently, new era of Double Decker Express trains are introduced in Indian Railways which is named as Uday Express. Currently, two Uday Express trains are in service. The first one is Bangalore City–Coimbatore Uday Express and the second is Visakhapatnam–Vijayawada Uday Express.

AC double decker trains
The AC Double Decker coaches has seating capacity of 120 seats, divided into lower deck, upper deck and mezzanine seating area.

Defunct AC double decker express

Non-AC double decker trains

See also

References